The Federação de Futebol de Mato Grosso do Sul (English: Football Association of Mato Grosso do Sul state) was founded on December 3, 1978, and it manages all the official football tournaments within the state of Mato Grosso do Sul, which are the Campeonato Sul-Mato-Grossense, the Campeonato Sul-Mato-Grossense lower levels and the Copa MS de Futebol, and represents the clubs at the Brazilian Football Confederation (CBF).

References

Mato Grosso do Sul
Football in Mato Grosso do Sul
Sports organizations established in 1978
1978 establishments in Brazil